"Trouble" is a song by the British new wave and synth-pop band Heaven 17, which was released in 1987 as the second and final single from their fourth studio album Pleasure One. It was written and produced by Glenn Gregory, Ian Craig Marsh and Martyn Ware. The song peaked at No. 51 in the UK and spent four weeks on the chart. It was a bigger success in Germany where it reached No. 17.

A music video was filmed to promote the single. The 12" single re-titled as "(Big) Trouble".

Critical reception
On its release, Lesley O'Toole of Record Mirror wrote, "Once upon a time, if you didn't own a copy of 'Fascist Groove Thang', you were much too untrendy to be seen associating with. Since then, Heaven 17 have cobbled together the odd pearl of synthesised wisdom, but with decreasing regularity. 'Trouble' does little to alleviate fears that the rot is setting in, being just another mish-mash of unexciting keyboard riffs and irritatingly distinctive Glenn Gregory mouthings." John Lee of the Huddersfield Daily Examiner gave the song a six out of 10 rating and commented, "Certainly not the greatest Heaven 17 song of all time, 'Trouble' nevertheless chugs along very nicely." Paul Benbow of the Reading Evening Post stated, "The jaunty tune and lyrics spat out like machine gun fire don't really go together. Not their best effort."

Steve Mitchell of the Nottingham Evening Post awarded three out of five stars and wrote, "Modern computer-bop that Janice will plug, Peely will scorn and Smitty will spin twice." Andy Rutherford of the Gateshead Post commented, "A sadly redundant and seemingly endless keyboard dominated funk track from a band who used to write great songs." In a retrospective review of Pleasure One, Aaron Badgley of AllMusic praised the "wonderful" "Trouble" as one of the band's best tracks, adding that the "guitar work makes the song itself".

Formats
7" single
"Trouble" - 4:00
"Move Out" - 3:19

12" single
"(Big) Trouble" - 5:49
"Trouble (LP version)" - 4:17
"Move Out" - 3:19

12" single (promo)
"Trouble (At Mill Mix)" - 6:42
"(Big) Trouble (Vocal)" - 5:49

12" single (limited edition gatefold)
"(Big) Trouble (Extended Mix)" - 5:51
"Move Out (Album Mix)" - 3:20
"Trouble (U.S. Club Mix)" - 6:45
"Contenders (U.S. Club Mix)" - 7:47

Chart performance

Personnel
Heaven 17
 Glenn Gregory - lead vocals, backing vocals, producer, arranger, mixing, engineer
 Martyn Ware - sampler (Emulator II), Mellotron, SP 12 Programming, producer, arranger, mixing, engineer
 Ian Craig Marsh - Fairlight programming, producer, arranger, mixing, engineer

Additional personnel
 Tim Cansfield - guitar
 Phil Spalding - bass
 Brian Tench - mixing
 Tim Hunt - engineer
 Bruce Forest - remixes of "Trouble (At Mill Mix)", "Contenders (U.S. Club Mix)" and "Trouble (U.S. Club Mix)"
 Heaven 17, Assorted Images - sleeve design
 Peter Anderson - photography

References

1987 singles
1987 songs
Heaven 17 songs
Songs written by Martyn Ware
Songs written by Glenn Gregory
Songs written by Ian Craig Marsh